Bobsam 'Bob' Elejiko (18 August 1981 – 13 November 2011) was a Nigerian footballer. He played as a central defender for several domestic teams between 2000 and 2011 before his death on the field during a football match.

Career
During his career, spent almost exclusively in Belgium, Elejiko represented FSV Wacker 90 Nordhausen, K.V. Turnhout, K.V.C. Westerlo, Royal Antwerp FC, S.C. Beira-Mar, K.M.S.K. Deinze, K.V. Red Star Waasland and K. Merksem S.C..

In 2008, he had trials with FC Carl Zeiss Jena, Crewe Alexandra, Gillingham and RBC Roosendaal, but did not gain a contract with any club.

Death
Elejiko collapsed while playing a fifth-tier match with his team K. Merksem S.C. against F.C. Kaart, a team from Merksem, Antwerp, on 13 November 2011. Despite resuscitation attempts pitch side, Elejiko was pronounced dead and the match was abandoned. The cause was later determined to be a traumatic rupture of the aorta.

References

External links
 Voetbal International profile 

1981 births
2011 deaths
Nigerian footballers
Association football defenders
Belgian Pro League players
Challenger Pro League players
KFC Turnhout players
K.V.C. Westerlo players
Royal Antwerp F.C. players
S.C. Beira-Mar players
S.K. Beveren players
Nigerian expatriate footballers
Expatriate footballers in Belgium
Expatriate footballers in Portugal
Nigerian expatriate sportspeople in Belgium
Association football players who died while playing
K.M.S.K. Deinze players
Sport deaths in Belgium